A Killer Among Us is a 1990 drama/thriller TV film directed by Peter Levin and starring Jasmine Guy and Anna Maria Horsford.

Plot
Theresa is one of the twelve jurors who have to decide about a case of assassination. She believes very strongly in the innocence of the young man, but cannot convince the others. During the discussions, she realizes that one member of the jury knows details that he could not know from the trial alone. Since no one believes her suspicions, she investigates on her own.

External links
 

1990 television films
1990 films
1990 drama films
Films directed by Peter Levin